Stenopterapion is a genus of pear-shaped weevils in the family of beetles known as Brentidae. There are about six described species in Stenopterapion.

Species
These six species belong to the genus Stenopterapion:
 Stenopterapion cantabricum (Desbrochers des Loges, 1869) g
 Stenopterapion dubium (Desbrochers, 1896) g
 Stenopterapion intermedium (Eppelsheim, 1875) g
 Stenopterapion meliloti (Kirby, 1808) g b
 Stenopterapion scutellare (Kirby, 1811) g
 Stenopterapion subsquamosum (Desbrochers, 1891) g
Data sources: i = ITIS, c = Catalogue of Life, g = GBIF, b = Bugguide.net

References

Further reading

External links

 

Brentidae